The Agöb languages are a group of Pahoturi languages spoken in eastern Morehead Rural LLG, Western Province, Papua New Guinea.  The language varieties include Agöb (or Dabu), Ende, and Kawam. Languages in this group, along with the Idi language, form a dialect chain with the Idi and Agob dialects proper at the ends of the chain.

Ende 
Ende is a language spoken primarily in the villages of Kinkin, Limol, and Malam by 600 to 1000 speakers. Ende's phoneme inventory includes 19 consonants and 7 vowels.

See also
Idi language

Bibliography
Kate Lynn Lindsey and Bernard Comrie. 2020. Ende (Papua New Guinea) dictionary. In: Key, Mary Ritchie & Comrie, Bernard (eds.) The Intercontinental Dictionary Series. Leipzig: Max Planck Institute for Evolutionary Anthropology. (CLDF dataset)

Notes

Further reading

References

External links 
Faces of the Ende Language Project
OLAC resources in and about the Agob language

Pahoturi languages
Languages of Western Province (Papua New Guinea)